A peninsula is a landform that extends from a mainland and is surrounded by water on most, but not all of its borders. A peninsula is also sometimes defined as a piece of land bordered by water on three of its sides. Peninsulas exist on all continents. The size of a peninsula can range from tiny to very large. The largest peninsula in the world is the Arabian Peninsula. Peninsulas form due to a variety of causes.

Etymology 
Peninsula derives , which is translated as 'peninsula'.  itself was derived , or together, 'almost an island'. The word entered English in the 16th century.

Definitions 

A peninsula is usually defined as a piece of land surrounded on most, but not all sides, but is sometimes instead defined as a piece of land bordered by water on three of its sides.

A peninsula may be bordered by more than one body of water, and the body of water does not have to be an ocean or a sea. A piece of land on a very tight river bend or one between two rivers is sometimes said to form a peninsula, for example in the New Barbadoes Neck in New Jersey, United States. A peninsula may be connected to the mainland via an isthmus, for example, in the isthmus of Corinth which connects to the Peloponnese peninsula.

Formation and types 
Peninsulas can be formed from continental drift, glacial erosion, glacial meltwater, glacial deposition, marine sediment, marine transgressions, volcanoes, divergent boundaries, and/or river sedimentation. More than one factor may play into the formation of a peninsula. For example, in the case of Florida, continental drift, marine sediment, and marine transgressions were all contributing factors to its shape.

Glaciers 
In the case of formation from glaciers, (e.g. the Antarctic Peninsula or Cape Cod) peninsulas can be created due to glacial erosion, meltwater, and/or deposition. If erosion formed the peninsula, softer and harder rocks were present, and since the glacier only erodes softer rock, it formed a basin. This may create peninsulas, and occurred for example in the Keweenaw Peninsula.

In the case of formation from meltwater, melting glaciers deposit sediment and form moraines, which act as dams for the meltwater. This may create bodies of water that surround the land, forming peninsulas.

If deposition formed the peninsula, the peninsula was composed of sedimentary rock, which was created from a large deposit of glacial drift. The hill of drift becomes a peninsula if the hill formed near water but was still connected to the mainland, for example during the formation of Cape Cod about 23,000 years ago.

Others 
In the case of formation from volcanoes, when a volcano erupts magma near water, it may form a peninsula (e.g. the Alaskan Peninsula). Peninsulas formed from volcanoes are especially common when the volcano erupts near shallow water. Marine sediment may form peninsulas by the creation of limestone. A rift peninsula may form as a result of a divergent boundary in plate tectonics (e.g. the Arabian Peninsula), while a convergent boundary may also form peninsulas (e.g. Gibraltar or the Indian subcontinent). Peninsulas can also form due to sedimentation in rivers. When a river carrying sediment flows into an ocean, the sediment is deposited, forming a delta peninsula.

Marine transgressions (changes in sea level) may form peninsulas, but also may affect existing peninsulas. For example, the water level may change, which causes a peninsula to become an island during high water levels. Similarly, wet weather causing higher water levels make peninsulas appear smaller, while dry weather make them appear larger. Sea level rise from global warming will permanently reduce the size of some peninsulas over time.

Uses 
Peninsulas are noted for their use as shelter for humans and Neanderthals. The landform is advantageous because it gives hunting access to both land and sea animals. They can also serve as markers of nation's borders.

Abridged list of peninsulas 

Europe
 Apennine Peninsula 
 Balkan Peninsula
 Brittany
 Calabria
 Chalkidiki
 Cornwall
 Crimea
 Fennoscandia
 Iberian Peninsula
 Istria
 Jutland
 Kola
 Pelion
 Peloponnese
 Wirral Peninsula

Africa
 Cape Bon
 Cape Peninsula
 Cape Verde Peninsula
 Horn of Africa
 Ras Nouadhibou

Asia
 Anatolia
 Arabian Peninsula
 Chukchi Peninsula
 Indian Subcontinent
 Indochinese Peninsula
 Kamchatka
 Korean Peninsula
 Liaodong Peninsula
 Malay Peninsula
 Shandong Peninsula
 Sinai Peninsula

Australia
 Arnhem Land
 Cape York Peninsula
 Jervis Bay Territory

Americas
 Alaska Peninsula
 Baja California Peninsula
 Cape Cod
 Delmarva Peninsula
 Florida
 Gaspé Peninsula
 Kitsap Peninsula
 Labrador
 Lost Peninsula
 Lower Peninsula of Michigan
 Nova Scotia
 Ontario Peninsula
 San Francisco Peninsula
 Southern Cone
 Upper Peninsula of Michigan
 Washington Land
 Yucatán

Antarctica
 Antarctic Peninsula

See also 

 Barrier island
 Cape
 Headland
 Promontory
 Salient
 Spit

References

Bibliography 

Landforms